Lissette Álvarez Chorens, commonly known as Lissette, (born March 10, 1947) is a singer, songwriter, and record producer from Cuba. She is best known for recording a Spanish language-version of Bonnie Tyler's "Total Eclipse of the Heart" in 1985.

Early life
Lissette was born March 10, 1947, in Lima, Peru, at a time when her parents, Cuban TV stars Olga Chorens and Tony Álvarez (Olga y Tony), were touring South America. While living with her parents in Havana, Cuba, Lissette made her first recording at age 5, the children's song "El Ratoncito Miguel", which would eventually become a hit for her.

She and her sister Olguita were sent to live in the United States when she was 14 years old (on September 13, 1961) through Operation Peter Pan, a US government sponsored program in conjunction with the Catholic Welfare Bureau, and which transported 14,000 Cuban children from Cuba to the United States. The scheme was devised for families opposed to the Cuban revolution of 1959, who feared that the government would indoctrinate their children into communism. Lissette has supported Yo No Coopero Con La Dictadura (I Do Not Cooperate with the Dictatorship).

Career
After two years in the US, Lissette and her sister were reunited with their parents in Miami and the whole family moved to Puerto Rico in 1965 where she lived until 1979 and where she worked as a singer. In 1977 she was selected by Univision, the biggest Spanish Language TV Channel of America to represent the United States in the sixth edition of the OTI Festival. Her entry, entitled "Si hay amor volverá" (If there is love, he will return) was warmly welcomed by the national juries, to the point that she ended second with eight points in a tie with the Dominican entrant Fernando Casado.

Lissette started her career in Puerto Rico as an adolescent, then later moved to Miami. She hosted her own shows in the Telemundo network in Puerto Rico for several years and did Emmy Award winning TV specials at Channel 10 and Channel 4 in Miami, Florida. Lissette had a successful recording career having more than 30 albums including 8 gold albums and 2 platinum albums. Lissette is an accomplished singer and songwriter who has produced most of her albums. She has received countless awards during her singing career, including a UNICEF award for her humanitarian work with children.

In Latin America, she is known as: "an interpreter of romantic songs influenced by the ballad" (Cuban Music from A to Z, page 12).

Family
She was first married to singer Chucho Avellanet. Together, they hosted El Show de Chucho y Lissette on Telemundo. Lissette is now married to Grammy award-winning singer and songwriter Willy Chirino. They reside in Miami.

References

Sources
Cuban Music from A to Z. By Helio Orovio. Durham, NC: Duke University Press, 2004. xi, 235 p.

External links
Official Website

1947 births
Living people
Cuban women singers
People from Lima
Exiles of the Cuban Revolution in the United States